The Oeffag G , sometimes known as the Oeffag Type G or Oeffag-Mickl G, was a three-engined reconnaissance flying boat built in Austria during the First World War and deployed by the Kaiserlich und Königlich Seefliegerkorps  (K.u.K. Seefliegerkorps) (Imperial and Royal naval aviation).

Design and development
The Oeffag G was a relatively large flying boat, following the design practises used for the smaller Lohner flying boats developed in Austria contemporaneously. The aircraft was a biplane with the wings mounted above a slender all-wood monocoque fuselage/hull, with the biplane tail unit mounted above the extreme tail end of the fuselage. The three pusher engines were mounted in open nacelles, supported by struts, between the main-planes. Early aircraft were armed with a large  D/20 cannon in the front cockpit and later machines had a machine gun fitted on a flexible mount aft of the wings.

Operational history
Most of the ten aircraft completed saw service with the K.u.K. Seefliegerkorps, from 1916, operating principally from the Pola Naval station, (now Pula), on the Istria peninsula, in what is now Croatia.

Variants
The  Oeffag G was developed as each aircraft was built, but the major differences involved the powerplants and the tail unit.
G.1 and G.3powered by  Hiero 6 cylinder water-cooled inline piston engines, built with the original biplane tail unit mounted on struts above the fuselage, fitted with triple rudders.
G.4 to G.7 powered by  Austro-Daimler 6 cylinder engines, with the original biplane tail unit
G.8 and G.9powered by  Hiero 6 engines, introducing a monoplane strut mounted tailplane with a single fin and rudder mounted on the fuselage and tailplane.
G.10 and G.11 aircraft not completed
G.12powered by  Austro-Daimler 6 cylinder engines, with the later monoplane tail unit.

Operators
 Austro-Hungarian Empire
Kaiserlich und Königlich Seefliegerkorps

Specifications (estimated)

References

Further reading

External links
Images

1910s Austro-Hungarian military reconnaissance aircraft
Three-engined pusher aircraft
Flying boats
Military aircraft of World War I
G
Aircraft first flown in 1916